Aleksandar Stanisavljević (born 27 January 1998) is a Serbian professional footballer who plays as a defender. He also holds Russian citizenship.

Career statistics

Club

References

External links

1998 births
Living people
Serbian footballers
Serbia youth international footballers
Naturalised citizens of Russia
Association football defenders
PFC Slavia Sofia players
FC Botev Vratsa players
FK Radnik Surdulica players
FC Tom Tomsk players
First Professional Football League (Bulgaria) players
Serbian expatriate footballers
Expatriate footballers in Bulgaria
PFC CSKA Moscow players